Clinostomus is a genus of cyprinid fish that occur in eastern North America. There are two species in this genus.

Species
 Clinostomus elongatus (Kirtland, 1840) (Redside dace)
 Clinostomus funduloides Girard, 1856 (Rosyside dace)

References